Rashid Salih Hamad Al-Athba (born October 18, 1987) is a Qatari sport shooter. Hamad represented Qatar at the 2008 Summer Olympics in Beijing, where he competed in the men's skeet shooting, along with four-time Olympian Nasser Al-Attiyah. He finished only in thirty-seventh place for the two-day qualifying rounds, with a total score of 106 points.

References

External links
NBC 2008 Olympics profile

Qatari male sport shooters
Living people
Olympic shooters of Qatar
Shooters at the 2008 Summer Olympics
Shooters at the 2016 Summer Olympics
1987 births
Shooters at the 2014 Asian Games
Shooters at the 2018 Asian Games
Asian Games competitors for Qatar